IV liiga is the sixth and lowest football league organised by the Estonian Football Association. Its season starts in April and lasts until October.

IV liiga North/East 2018

 Tallinna Depoo
 Pakri SK Alexela
 Maardu United II
 Tallinna JK Piraaja II
 Põhja-Tallinna JK Volta III
 Maarjamäe FC Igiliikur
 Tallinna FC Soccernet
 FC Tallinn

IV liiga South 2018

 FC Äksi Wolves
 Vaimastvere SK Illi
 Põhja-Sakala II
 Tartu JK Tammeka IV
 Tartu FC Loomaaed
 Tartu JK Welco X
 Tartu FC Helios II

IV liiga North/West 2018

 FC Lelle
 Paide United
 Märjamaa Kompanii
 Kristiine JK
 Tallinna JK Jalgpallihaigla
 Tallinna FC Olympic Olybet
 FC Toompea
 Tallinna FC Reaal

IV liiga finals

IV Liiga Finals 2012

IV Liiga Finals 2013

IV Liiga Finals 2014

IV Liiga Finals 2015

IV Liiga Finals 2016

IV Liiga Finals 2017

References

External links
 IV liiga ida 
 IV liiga põhi 
 IV liiga lõuna 
 IV liiga lääs 
IV liiga finals

6
Est
Estonian Football Championship